This page has a list of lawsuits related to equality of the sexes.

See also
 Ladies' night § Legality in the United States

References

External links
 Walmart Class (class action sex discrimination lawsuit against Wal-Mart)
 Judge certifies Wal-Mart class action - U.S. business- nbcnews.com

Case law lists by subject
 
Lawsuits
Human rights-related lists
Lists of lawsuits